This is a list of art by J. Alden Weir, the American impressionist painter:

A

 After the Ride (a.k.a. Visiting Neighbors)  Date unknown
 Afternoon by the Pond ca 1908-1909  Painting - oil on canvas
 An Alsatian Girl Date unknown    
 At the Piano   1876-1877  Painting - oil on canvas  
 Autumn Days  1900-1910  Painting - oil on canvas  
 Autumn Rain  1890

B

 Back Road 1900-1910  Painting - oil on canvas
 The Birches  1903  Painting - oil on canvas  
 The Black Hat  1898  Painting - oil on canvas  
 The Blue Gown  1907  Painting - oil on canvas  
 Branchville, Connecticut  Date unknown
 The Bridge: Nocturne (a.k.a. Nocturne: Queensboro Bridge)  1910  Painting - oil on canvas  
 The Building of the Dam  1908  Painting - oil on canvas

C
 Connecticut Scene at Branchville  Date unknown    
 Cora  Date unknown

F

 Face Reflected in a Mirror  1896  Painting - oil on canvas  
 The Factory Village  1897  Painting - oil on canvas  
 The Farmer's Lawn  1880-1889  Unknown  
 Fireside Dreams  1887  Painting - watercolor  
 Flowers in a Delft Jug  Date unknown    
 A Follower of Groliier  Date unknown

G

 Girl Knitting  Date unknown    
 Girl Standing by a Gate  Date unknown 
Grapes, Knife and Glass, after 1880   
 Green Hills and Farmland  Date unknown 
 The Grey Trellis  1891  Painting - oil on canvas
 The Yellow Turban ca.

H
 Houses in Pasture  Date unknown

I

 The Ice Cutters  1895  Painting - oil on canvas  
 Ideal Head  Date unknown  Painting - oil on board  
 Idle Hours  1888  Painting - oil on canvas  
 The Inlet  Date unknown  Drawing
 In the Livingroom  1890  Painting - oil on canvas

K
 Knitting for Soldiers 1918 Painting - oil on canvas

L

 The Lace Maker  Date unknown  Painting - oil on canvas  
 Landscape with Seated Figure  Date unknown  Painting - oil on canvas  
 Landscape with Steeple, Wyndham  1892  Painting - oil on canvas  
 Landscape with Stone Wall, Windham  1892  Painting - oil on canvas  
 The Laundry, Branchville  1894  Painting - oil on canvas  
 The Letter  1910-1919  Painting - oil on canvas 
 Little Lizie Lynch  1910  Painting - oil on canvas  
 Loading Ice  Date unknown  Painting - oil on canvas

M

 Midday  1891  Painting - oil on canvas  
 Midsummer Landscape  1914  Painting - oil on canvas 
 Miss Edith Potter   undated  Painting - oil on canvas
 Mother and Child  Date unknown  Painting - oil on canvas  
 Mother and Child  1891  Painting - oil on canvas

N
 Nassau, Bahamas  1913  Painting - oil on canvas
 New England Barnyard 1904 Painting - oil on canvas

O

 On the Shore  1909  Painting - oil on canvas  
 Overhanging Trees 1909  Painting - oil on canvas

P

 Pan and the Wolf  ca 1907
 Portrait of a Young Woman with Ivy in her Hair  ca 1890
 Portrait of Mrs. Robert Walter Weir  ca 1885
 Portrait of Robert Walter Weir ca 1885
 Ploughing for Buckwheat  1909 or earlier
 The Path in the Woods  ca 1903
 The Plaza: Nocturne   1911
 "Portobello Pier from near Joppa Saltpans" 1893

R

 Ravine near Branchville  1905-1915  Painting - oil on canvas  
 The Red Bridge  1895  Painting - oil on canvas 
 The Return of the Fishing Party, oil on canvas, 1906 
 The Road to No-Where  1880-1889  Painting - oil on canvas
 Roses  1883 -1884 Painting - oil on canvas 
 Roses in a Silver Bowl on a Mahogany Table  1888-1890  Painting - oil on canvas

S
 Silver Chalice with Roses  1882  Painting - oil on canvas  
 Silver Chalice, Japanese Bronze and Red Tapir  1884-1889  Painting - oil on canvas  
 Still Life  1902-1905  Painting - oil on canvas 
 Studio Tea Unknown date 
 Summer (a.k.a. Friends)  1898  Painting - oil on canvas  
 Summer Afternoon, Shinnecock Landscape  1902  Painting - oil on canvas

U

 Upland Pasture  1905  Painting - oil on canvas

V

 Vase and Roses  1886-1889  Painting - oil on canvas  
 The Veranda  1900  Painting - oil on canvas

W
 The Wharves, Nassau  1913  Painting - oil on canvas
 Winter Landscape with Stream  1888  Painting - oil on canvas
Woodland Rocks 1910-1919  Painting - oil on canvas
 Woods in the Snow 1895 Painting- oil on canvas

Y
 The Yellow Turban  ca 1900

Gallery

External links
 Artcyclopedia Web page on Weir art
 Athenaeum Web page on Weir art
 Weir Farm - National Historic Site in Connecticut

Weir, J. Alden